
Gmina Radziłów is a rural gmina (administrative district) in Grajewo County, Podlaskie Voivodeship, in north-eastern Poland.

Villages
Gmina Radziłów contains the villages and settlements of Barwiki, Borawskie-Awissa, Borawskie-Awissa-Kolonia, Brodowo, Brychy, Czachy, Czaple, Czerwonki, Dębówka, Dusze, Glinki, Grąd, Janowo, Karwowo, Kieljany, Klimaszewnica, Konopki, Konopki-Awissa, Kownatki, Kramarzewo, Łoje-Awissa, Łoje-Gręzko, Mikuty, Mścichy, Okrasin, Ostrowik, Racibory, Radziłów, Radziłów-Kolonia, Rydzewo Szlacheckie, Rydzewo-Pieniążek, Słucz, Słucz-Kolonie, Sośnia, Święcienin, Święcienin-Kolonia, Szlasy, Szyjki, Wiązownica, Wypychy, Zakrzewo and Zawisie.

Neighbouring gminas
Gmina Radziłów is bordered by the districts of Goniądz, Grajewo, Jedwabne, Przytuły, Trzcianne and Wąsosz.

References

Polish official population figures 2006

External links
 Jewish history of Radzilow

Radzilow
Grajewo County